Balter is a surname. Notable people with the surname include:

Ben Balter, American lawyer
Marcos Balter (born 1974), Brazilian classical composer
Maxim Balter (born 1988), Ukrainian director and producer
Meyer Balter (born 1954), Canadian physician
Sam Balter (1909–1998), American basketball player and sportscaster